Gian Piero Reverberi (born 29 July 1939 in Genoa) is an Italian pianist, composer, arranger, conductor, and entrepreneur.

Biography 
After obtaining Diplomas in piano and composition from the Paganini Conservatory in Genoa, Reverberi worked in a wide range of media, including TV themes, spaghetti Western soundtracks to pop and rock records, where alongside Robert Mellin he composed the memorable theme music to the children's TV series The Adventures of Robinson Crusoe in 1964. He created the Rondò Veneziano ensemble. He also worked with his brother Gianfranco Reverberi on the song "Last Man Standing" (or "Nel cimitero di Tucson") from the soundtrack of Django, Prepare a Coffin (Preparati la bara!), which was sampled in Gnarls Barkley's hit "Crazy".

As a producer, Reverberi worked for New Trolls and Le Orme progressive rock bands, being also listed as one of the official members of the latter for a short stint. In the 1960s-1970s he was also the producer of several albums of singer-songwriters such as Lucio Battisti, Fabrizio De André, Luigi Tenco and Gino Paoli.

In 1979, he founded the Rondò Veneziano chamber orchestra, which he has led ever since, having been the main composer, arranger, and conductor of the group. They play original instruments, incorporating a modern rock-style rhythm section comprising synthesizer, bass guitar and drums.

Discography
1966 – Lui non t'ama come me/Sono momenti/Ti penso e prego (Orchestra di Gian Piero Reverberi)
1969 – Plenilunio d'agosto/Dialogo d'Amore
1971 – Messaggio per te (musica di Gian Piero Reverberi)/Hot Underground Group
1975 – Reverberi
1976 – Timer
1977 – Stairway to Heaven
1990 – Colonna sonora per l'International Tennis Tournament di Monaco di Baviera con l'album GSC - Open Universe (BMG Ariola)
1993 – L'antivirtuoso
1997 – The Adventures of Robinson Crusoe (with Robert Mellin)

See also 
Rondò Veneziano

References

External links
 
  Rondò Veneziano official Website - see 'Il Maestro'

1939 births
Living people
Musicians from Genoa
Italian male conductors (music)
20th-century Italian conductors (music)
Italian film score composers
Italian male film score composers
21st-century Italian conductors (music)
21st-century Italian male musicians
20th-century Italian composers
21st-century composers
20th-century Italian male musicians